In the mathematical field of descriptive set theory, a pointclass can be called adequate if it contains all recursive pointsets and is closed under recursive substitution, bounded universal and existential quantification and preimages by recursive functions.

References

Descriptive set theory